Mark David Moores (born April 28, 1970) is an American businessman and politician serving as a member of the New Mexico Senate for the 21st district. Elected in November 2012, he took office on January 15, 2013. He was the Republican nominee for the 2021 New Mexico's 1st congressional district special election, which he lost to Democrat Melanie Stansbury.

Early life and education
Moores was born and raised in the suburbs of Washington, D.C. His mother, who is of Hispano descent, is originally from Española, New Mexico and Moores spent summers and holidays in northern New Mexico. After graduating from Walt Whitman High School, Moores moved to New Mexico to attend the University of New Mexico, where he was awarded a scholarship to play football for the Lobos. He earned a Bachelor of Arts degree in political science and later an MBA from the Anderson School of Management.

Career

Early career 
Moores was the chief of staff for Lieutenant Governor Walter Dwight Bradley and a field representative for Congressman Steven Schiff. From 2006 to 2017, Moores was the executive director of the New Mexico Dental Association, where he was responsible for managing free dental clinics across New Mexico.

New Mexico Senate 
In 2012, Moores ran in the three-way Republican primary for the 21st district of the New Mexico Senate, winning with 2,020 votes (50%). He won the November 6, 2012 general election with 14,067 votes (56.6%) against incumbent Democratic Senator Lisa Curtis, who had been appointed to fill the vacancy when Kent Cravens resigned. In 2016, Moores defeated Democratic nominee Gregory B. Frazier with 15,164 votes (56.09%).

2021 congressional election 

In March 2021, Moores announced his candidacy for the 2021 New Mexico's 1st congressional district special election. He earned the Republican party's nomination at the committee selection on March 27, 2021. He faced State Representative Melanie Stansbury and former Public Lands Commissioner Aubrey Dunn Jr. in the June 1 election.

Moores lost to Stansbury in the special election.

Personal life 
Moores and his wife, Lisa Moores, have four children and three grandchildren.

References

External links
 Official page at the New Mexico Legislature
 Campaign site
 
 Mark Moores at Ballotpedia
 Mark Moores at the National Institute on Money in State Politics

21st-century American politicians
Living people
Republican Party New Mexico state senators
Place of birth missing (living people)
Politicians from Albuquerque, New Mexico
University of New Mexico alumni
American people of Spanish descent
Candidates in the 2021 United States elections
1970 births
Walt Whitman High School (Maryland) alumni